The seventh day may refer to:

 Saturday in some calendars
 Sunday in other calendars
 Friday in the Bahá'í calendar
 Shabbat in Judaism
 Sabbath in seventh-day churches
 Qixi Festival, a Chinese festival that falls on the seventh day of the 7th month on the Chinese calendar

Film and TV
The 7th Day, a 2004 Spanish film
 7th Day (film), a 2014 Malayalam film
 The Seventh Day (1922 film), a 1922 American silent film
 The Seventh Day (2021 film), a 2021 American film
 The Seventh Day (TV series), a 2008 Hong Kong television series

Others
 The Seventh Day (album), a 2008 Chinese album by Thin Man
 The Seventh Day (novel), a 2013 Chinese novel by Yu Hua

See also
 Biblical Sabbath
 Sabbath in Christianity
 Seventh-day Adventist Church